
Gmina Jakubów is a rural gmina (administrative district) in Mińsk County, Masovian Voivodeship, in east-central Poland. Its seat is the village of Jakubów, which lies approximately 8 kilometres (5 mi) north-east of Mińsk Mazowiecki and 45 km (28 mi) east of Warsaw.

Villages
Gmina Jakubów contains the villages and settlements of Aleksandrów, Anielinek, Antonin, Brzozówka, Budy Kumińskie, Góry, Izabelin, Jakubów, Jędrzejów Nowy, Jędrzejów Stary, Józefin, Kamionka, Łaziska, Leontyna, Ludwinów, Mistów, Moczydła, Nart, Przedewsie, Rządza, Strzebula, Szczytnik, Turek, Tymoteuszew, Wiśniew and Wola Polska.

Neighbouring gminas
Gmina Jakubów is bordered by the gminas of Cegłów, Dobre, Kałuszyn, Mińsk Mazowiecki and Stanisławów.

References

Polish official population figures 2006

Jakubow
Mińsk County